This is a list of Sepahan F.C.'s results at the IPL 2007/08, the 2007 ACL, the 2007 Club World Cup, and the 2008 ACL. The club is competing in the Iran Pro League, Hazfi Cup, as well as the Asian Champions League, and FIFA Club World Cup.

Players

Updated 20 December 2017.

First-team squad

 
 

 [U21 = Under 21 year player | U23 = Under 23 year player| U25 = Under 25 year player]

For recent transfers, see List of Iranian football transfers summer 2018.

Matches

Pro league

League table

Results summary

Results by round

Matches

2007 AFC Champions League

Group stage

Knock-out stage

Bracket

Sepahan progress 5–4 on penalties after 0–0 aggregate score

Sepahan progress 3–1 on aggregate

Urawa Red Diamonds win 3–1 on aggregate

FIFA Club World Cup

Bracket

Hazfi Cup

2008 AFC Champions League

Group stage

Goals

Sepahan squad IPL statistics

References

Sepahan S.C. seasons
Iranian football clubs 2007–08 season